The Toowoomba Rugby League is a competition involving football clubs from the city of Toowoomba and surrounding towns and districts. It is run under the auspices of Queensland Rugby League Central Division.

Clubs
Clubs with A-Grade team
  Dalby Diehards
  Gatton Hawks
  Goondiwindi Boars
  Oakey Bears
  Pittsworth Danes
  Souths Tigers
  Toowoomba Brothers Leprechauns
  Valleys Roosters
  Warwick Cowboys
  Wattles Warriors
  Highfields Eagles
  Newtown Lions

All the clubs with A-Grade sides also field Reserve Grade sides.

Premiers 1980 to present
Grand Final results compiled from scores published in the Rugby League Week.

Premiers 1919 to 1979
Premiers published in The Chronicle.

Toowoomba Rugby League Premiers

 (C) = Colts

References

External Links and Sources
 Rugby League Week at State Library of NSW Research and Collections
 The centenary of the greatest game under the sun : one hundred years of Rugby League in Queensland, Prof. Maxwell Howell, Celebrity Books, 2008.

Queensland Rugby League
Sport in Toowoomba
Recurring sporting events established in 1919
1919 establishments in Australia
Sports leagues established in 1919